Imaad Wasif is the first solo album by the Los Angeles-based songwriter Imaad Wasif, released in 2006. The album was recorded in Nashville, taking only a week and a day, and was produced by Mark Nevers. Wasif toured in support of the album as the opening act for the Yeah Yeah Yeahs in 2006 and 2007.

Track listing
 Spark  – 2:39
 Out In the Black  – 2:37
 Whisper  – 3:33
 Into the Static  – 2:41
 Fade in Me  – 3:35
 Isolation  – 2:27
 Blade  – 2:31
 Coil  – 2:49
 Without  – 4:44
 (Dandelion)  – 4:47
 Tomorrow Is Ours  – 2:48

References

2006 debut albums